East Skeam Island is an island in Roaringwater Bay, County Cork, Munster, Ireland, that forms part of Carbery's Hundred Isles. It is currently uninhabited (see Demographics below).

Demographics

References

External links
 A herd of wild goats cross a sea arch in East Skeam Island

Islands of County Cork